Club Polideportivo Villarrobledo is a Spanish football club based in Villarrobledo, Albacete, in the autonomous community of Castile-La Mancha. Founded in 1971 as a replacement for folded CD Villarrobledo, it currently plays in Segunda División B holding home games at Estadio Nuestra Señora de la Caridad, with a 5,500-seat capacity.

History 
The club was founded on May 8, 1971 by José García Moya and other fans. 

In the 2010–11 season Villarrobledo finished in 14th position, just 9 points away from being relegated from the Tercera División. In the 2018–19 season the club finished 3rd in Tercera División – Group 18, and was promoted to Segunda División B.

Club background
Club Deportivo Villarrobledo – (1956–68)
Club Polideportivo Villarrobledo – (1971–)

Season to season

1 season in Segunda División B
39 seasons in Tercera División

Current squad

References

External links
Official website 
BDFutbol profile
Club & stadium history 

Football clubs in Castilla–La Mancha
Association football clubs established in 1958
1958 establishments in Spain
Villarrobledo